The North Korean football champions are the winners of the highest league in North Korean football, which is currently the DPR Korea Premier Football League.

Also listed here are the winners of North Korea's cup competitions (the Republican Championship, from 1972 to 2011, and the Hwaebul Cup from 2013 on), and the other annual league-like "Prize" competitions that North Korea's football clubs take part in (the Man'gyŏngdae Prize, the Osandŏk Prize, the Paektusan Prize, and the Poch'ŏnbo Torch Prize), which were used prior to the 2017–18 season to determine which teams played for the National Championship.

DPR Korea Football League

Technical Innovation Contests & National Championship

DPR Korea Football League (Round-robin tournament competitions)

Highest Class Football League

DPR Korea Premier Football League

Performance by club

DPR Korea Football League (Elimination tournament competitions)

DPR Korea Championship
Held 1972–2011.

Performance by club

Hwaebul Cup
Played since 2013, evidently as a replacement for the Republican Championship in men's football.

Performance by club

Mangyongdae Prize|Man'gyŏngdae Prize

Performance by club

Osandok Prize|Osandŏk Prize

Performance by club

Paektusan Prize

Performance by club

Poch'ŏnbo Torch Prize

Performance by club

References

  
Korea, North